Hóra Sfakíon or Sfakia (Σφακιά ) is a town on the south coast of Crete, Greece. It is the capital of the remote and mountainous region of Sfakiá, and is a small town of just 265 inhabitants (2011 census). It lies on the south coast near the end of the Imbros Gorge, 74 km south of Chania. It has two small harbours, where the ferry boats from Agia Roumeli dock, which in the summer bring the hikers from the Samaria Gorge to take buses back to the northern coast. From Hóra Sfakíon ferries also go to the nearby coastal town of Loutro and the island Gavdos.

Hóra Sfakíon is a small village with a main harbourfront of tavernas, two minimarkets, a butcher, and a bakery. There is a quiet local beach immediately west of the village, and several pebbly beaches nearby. Hóra Sfakíon has a variety of tourist accommodations: rooms, studios, and apartments. The local economy is based on tourism, fishing, olive-oil production, and sheep and goat herding.

Hóra Sfakíon prospered during the Venetian and Turkish occupations and up to the 18th century carried on a flourishing trade with its own small fleet. It was said to have had a hundred churches, but it suffered badly from wartime bombardment during the Battle of Crete and the Allied evacuation that followed.

Hóra Sfakíon is famous as one of the centers of resistance against the occupying forces of both the Venetians and the Turks. The impenetrable White Mountains to the north combined with the rocky beaches on the south helped the locals fight off all invaders. Anopolis, a village near Hóra Sfakíon, is the birthplace of one of the most celebrated Cretan revolutionaries, Daskalogiannis.

See also
 Battle of Crete
 Sfakians

References

External links

 Portal site about the region of Sfakiá
 Live webcam from the village of Hóra Sfakíon, Sfakiá
 Live beach webcam from the village of Hóra Sfakíon, Sfakiá
 Local guide to Sfakiá
 More than 1,000 pictures of Sfakia - from the 1960s until nowadays
  University of Lausanne history of Sfakiá

Mediterranean port cities and towns in Greece
Populated places in Chania (regional unit)